This is a list of currently reigning constituent monarchs, including traditional rulers and governing constitutional monarchs. Each monarch listed below reigns over a legally recognised dominion, but in most cases possess little or no sovereign governing power. Their titles, however, are recognised by the state. Entries are listed beside their respective dominions, and are grouped by country.

European monarchs

{| class="wikitable"
! width="16%" | State !! width="13%" | Polity !! width="24%" | Monarch !! width="13%" | Since !! width="12%" | House !! width="17%" | Succession !! width="5%" | Refs
|-
| bgcolor="#A9A9A9" style="vertical-align: top; border-color: white;" rowspan="1" |  Guernsey || bgcolor="#A9A9A9" |Sark || Christopher Beaumont || 3 July 2016 || Beaumont || Hereditary || 
|-
| bgcolor="#A9A9A9" style="vertical-align: top; border-color: white;" rowspan="1" |  Ireland || bgcolor="#A9A9A9" |Tory Island || Vacant || 19 October 2018 || Mac Ruaidhrí || Tanistry || 
|-
| bgcolor="#A9A9A9" style="vertical-align: top; border-color: white;" rowspan="1" |  United Kingdom || bgcolor="#A9A9A9" |Earldom of Orkney || Oliver Peter St John || 3 July 2016 || St. John || Hereditary || 
|-
| bgcolor="#A9A9A9" style="vertical-align: top; border-color: white;" rowspan="1" |  Italy || bgcolor="#A9A9A9" |Order of Malta'||John T. Dunlap || 3 July 2016 || N/A || Elective || 
|}

African monarchs

Asian monarchs

North American monarchs

South American monarchs

Oceanian monarchs

 Cook Islands 
Each major atoll in the Cook Islands has a number of arikis, ceremonial high chiefs who together form the Are Ariki, a parliamentary advisory body with up to 24 seats. The only domains not listed below are those of Manuae, on which current information is inadequate, and Penrhyn, whose chiefly line is extinct. Styles and names are listed in their conventional local form. In addition to the generic title of ariki, which is worn at the end of one's name, each chiefly line carries its own unique style, which is placed at the beginning. Thus, if the chief's name is "Henry" and his title is "Ngamaru", he is styled "Ngamaru Henry Ariki".

 Others 
In Fiji, which became a colony of the United Kingdom in 1874, the British monarchs were historically bestowed the title Tui Viti, which translates as "King of Fiji" or "Paramount Chief of Fiji". The last holder of the title (from 6 February 1952) was Queen Elizabeth II, of the House of Windsor. The state became a republic in 1987, abolishing the title by establishing a new constitution. The former Great Council of Chiefs, however, still recognised Elizabeth II as Tui Viti, as the nation's traditional queen and its supreme tribal chief, despite no longer holding a constitutional office. Consequently, while Fiji remains a republic, a monarch or paramount chief is still recognised by traditional tribal politics. The Queen made no official claim to the Tui Viti throne, although until at least 2002, she remained open to the possibility of a constitutional restoration of the monarchy.

Native chiefs in Fiji are considered members of the nobility. The House of Chiefs, consisting of about 70 chiefs of various rank determined by a loosely defined order of precedence, was modeled after the British House of Lords. Tongan chiefs, subordinate to a king, are also considered nobles and have therefore been excluded from the above list.

In American Samoa there are 12 paramount chiefs, all traditionally subordinate to the Tu'i Manu'a, a title that is now considered purely historical; the last titleholder, Elisala, died 2 July 1909. The paramount chiefly titles are: on Tutuila, Faumuina, Lei'ato, Letuli, Fuimaono, Tuitele, Satele, Mauga, and in the Manu'a Islands, Lefiti, Sotoa, Tufele, Misa and Tuiolosega''.

See also
 Ethnarch
 Heads of former ruling families
 Imperial, royal and noble ranks
 List of current monarchs of sovereign states
 List of current reigning monarchs by length of reign
 List of monarchies
 Lists of monarchs
 Monarchy
 Traditional authority
 Lists of office-holders
 Nobility
 List of current sovereign monarchs
 List of longest reigning current monarchs
 Royal and noble ranks
 African royalty
 Royalty in the Americas
 Asian royalty
 European royalty
 Oceanian royalty
 Dynasties by continents
 Monarchs by continent
 Tribal chiefs

Notes

North America

Oceania

References

Further reading

Monarchs
Lists of monarchs